Pimpirev Glacier on Livingston Island in the South Shetland Islands, Antarctica is situated south of the glacial divide between the Drake Passage and Bransfield Strait, southeast of Tundzha Glacier, southwest of Saedinenie Snowfield, west of Perunika Glacier and east-northeast of Kamchiya Glacier.  The feature extends 5.5 km in a southeast-northwest direction, and 1.8 km in northwest-southeast direction. The glacier drains southeastwards towards Pimpirev Beach, mostly terminating on the shore, and on several occasions penetrating the South Bay waters east-northeast of Ereby Point.

The feature is named for Christo Pimpirev, geologist in the First Bulgarian Antarctic Expedition in 1987/88 and leader of subsequent national Antarctic campaigns. The original name Pimpirev Ice Wall was given on October 29, 1996 to the 50-m high rectilinear ice scarp-slope running parallelly to and some 100 m inland from the coast of South Bay northeast of Ereby Point. Reflecting subsequent changes in the ice cap configuration, the present name form was approved for the relevant glacier on November 4, 2005.

Location

See also
 List of glaciers in the Antarctic
 Glaciology

Maps
 L.L. Ivanov. Livingston Island: Central-Eastern Region. Scale 1:25000 topographic map.  Sofia: Antarctic Place-names Commission of Bulgaria, 1996.
 L.L. Ivanov et al. Antarctica: Livingston Island and Greenwich Island, South Shetland Islands. Scale 1:100000 topographic map. Sofia: Antarctic Place-names Commission of Bulgaria, 2005.
 L.L. Ivanov. Antarctica: Livingston Island and Greenwich, Robert, Snow and Smith Islands. Scale 1:120000 topographic map.  Troyan: Manfred Wörner Foundation, 2009.

References
 Pimpirev Glacier. SCAR Composite Antarctic Gazetteer
 Bulgarian Antarctic Gazetteer. Antarctic Place-names Commission. (details in Bulgarian, basic data in English)

External links
 Pimpirev Glacier. Copernix satellite image

Glaciers of Livingston Island